|-
| Ćavarov Stan 
| Tomislavgrad
| Canton 10
|-
| Ćirići 
| Glamoč
| Canton 10
|-
| Ćosanlije 
| Livno
| Canton 10
|-
| Ćoslije 
| Glamoč
| Canton 10
|}

Lists of settlements in the Federation of Bosnia and Herzegovina (A-Ž)